Michael G. Kirby (born April 2, 1952) is a former member of the Wisconsin State Assembly.

Biography
Kirby was born on April 2, 1952 in Milwaukee, Wisconsin. After graduating from Wauwatosa West High School in Wauwatosa, Wisconsin, Kirby attended the University of Wisconsin-Oshkosh.

Career
Kirby was elected to the Assembly in 1974. He is a Democrat.

References

Politicians from Milwaukee
People from Wauwatosa, Wisconsin
Democratic Party members of the Wisconsin State Assembly
University of Wisconsin–Oshkosh alumni
1952 births
Living people